The N-432 is a road in Extremadura and Andalusia, Spain.

It starts in Badajoz near the Portugal border and heads southeast crossing Autovía A-66 after passing Zafra. The road exits Extremadura and enters Andalucía through Sierra Morena, passing Peñarroya. Then it crosses a reservoir in Embalse de Puente Nuevo before crossing Córdoba. It then follows Río Guadajoz passing Castro del Río and Baena. The road does a short incursion into the Province of Jaén before reaching its end in Granada.

N-432